Politics in Mizoram takes place in a multi-party democratic framework, within the overall context of the national Politics of India.  It has 1 parliamentary seats only. Politics in Mizoram is dominated by two political fronts: the Mizo National Front and the Mizoram Pradesh Congress Committee, part of Indian National Congress. These two parties have alternated in power since 1972.
Other regional parties are:

 Ephraim Israel National Convention
 Mizoram People's Conference
 Zoram People's Movement
 Maraland Democratic Front

Administration and governments 

The constitutional head of the Government of Mizoram is the Governor, who is appointed by the President of India. The real executive power rests with the Chief Minister and the cabinet. The political party or the coalition of political parties having a majority in the Legislative Assembly forms the Government.The first Chief Minister of Mizoram was Ch Chhunga.
The current incumbent, Chief Minister Pu Zoramthanga, succeeded Pu Lalthanhawla in 2018 .

The head of the bureaucracy of the State is called the Chief Secretary. Under him is a hierarchy of officials drawn from the Indian Administrative Service, Indian Police Service, and different wings of the State Civil Services.

Constituencies

Mizoram sends 1 representatives to the Lok Sabha, the lower house of the Parliament of India and 1 representative to the Rajya Sabha, the upper house. Auxiliary authorities conduct elections regularly for Local Council in Urban Areas and Village Council in rural who job is to govern local affairs. Mizoram has 3 autonomous tribal council:
Mara Autonomous District Council
Chakma Autonomous District Council
Lai Autonomous District Council

https://payoffaddress.com/credit-karma-login/

See also
Mizoram Secular Force

References